Government Medical College, Bhavnagar is a full-fledged Government Medical college. It was established in the year 1995. The college imparts the degree Bachelor of Medicine and Surgery (MBBS). Nursing and para-medical courses are also offered. The college is affiliated to Maharaja Krishnakumarsinhji Bhavnagar University and is recognised by Medical Council of India. The hospital associated with the college is one of the largest hospitals in the Bhavnagar. The selection to the college is done on the basis of merit through National Eligibility and Entrance Test. Yearly undergraduate student intake is 200. it has established medical education unit,

Courses
Government Medical College, Bhavnagar undertakes education and training of students MBBS courses. This college is offering 200 MBBS seats from 2019 of which 85% Seats are of state quota and 15% is for National  Counselling in undergraduate course and 50% State and 50% All India Quota

College also runs CMLT and X-ray technitian course

Seat Capacity

References

External links 
 http://gmcbhavnagar.edu.in/

1995 establishments in Gujarat
Educational institutions established in 1995
Medical colleges in Gujarat